Night Falls on the City is a 1967 novel by the British writer Sarah Gainham. A commercial and critical success, it was the first of her Vienna trilogy followed by A Place in the Country (1969) and Private Worlds (1971). Marking a change from the series of spy thrillers she produced in the 1950s, it remains her best-known work

Synopsis
Julia Homburg, daughter of a former Habsburg official, is an actress with the Austrian Burgtheater living through the last days of interwar Austria before the Anschluss of 1938 dramatically changes her life. In the wake of the Nazi takeover her husband Jewish politician Franz Wedeker is forced to go into hiding.

References

Bibliography
 Burton, Alan. Historical Dictionary of British Spy Fiction. Rowman & Littlefield, 2016.
 Reilly, John M. Twentieth Century Crime & Mystery Writers. Springer, 2015.

1967 British novels
Novels by Sarah Gainham
Novels set in the 1930s
Novels set in Vienna
William Collins, Sons books